Aminata Aboubakar Yacoub (born 22 June 1989 in Epena, Republic of the Congo) is a Republic of the Congo swimmer. She competed at the 2012 Summer Olympics in the Women's 50m freestyle event. Yacoub ranked at 69 and would not advance to the semifinals.

References

Living people
1989 births
Swimmers at the 2012 Summer Olympics
Republic of the Congo female swimmers
Olympic swimmers of the Republic of the Congo
People from Likouala Department